Forward is a hamlet in Norton Rural Municipality No. 69, Saskatchewan, Canada. It previously held the status of a village until December 31, 1947.

Demographics

Prior to December 31, 1947, Forward was incorporated as a village, and was restructured as a hamlet under the jurisdiction of the Rural municipality of Norton on that date.

Cairn 
A cairn marks the former site of the town, off Saskatchewan Highway 13 about 43 km West of Weyburn, Saskatchewan.  The plaque was installed in 1995 by the Saskatchewan History and Folklore Society and reads:Town of Forward

NW 12-8-19 W2M

Established 1911

In 1913 an entire town moved to this site, the junction of the Canadian Pacific-Canadian National rails. Visions of thriving commerce inspired the move of businesses and homes from the original location 4.8 km north east.

Forward, population near 1200, flourished. Town services: A lumber yard, notary public, printing-publishing shop, post office, implement agency, jail, school, church, firehall, drugstore, cafe, blacksmith, & livery barn.

Forward gradually declined. Structures were not rebuilt after fires. It lacked a grain elevator and other towns growing along the railway provided competition. The last house was removed from the site in 1966.

See also

List of communities in Saskatchewan
Hamlets of Saskatchewan

References

Norton No. 69, Saskatchewan
Former villages in Saskatchewan
Unincorporated communities in Saskatchewan
Division No. 2, Saskatchewan